Monica Tzasna Arriola Gordillo (14 May 1971 – 14 March 2016) was a Mexican politician affiliated with the New Alliance Party.

She died of brain cancer on 14 March 2016 in Mexico City.

Personal life and education
Arriola Gordillo was the daughter of Elba Esther Gordillo. She got her bachelor's degree in Latin American literature from the Universidad Iberoamericana.

Political career
Arriola was a member of the New Alliance Party who in 2006 secured a seat in the Chamber of Deputies of Mexico via proportional representation to serve during the LX Legislature. In October 2006 she traveled to other Latin American countries with Felipe Calderón during the first overseas trip of Calderon as president-elect of Mexico.

References 

1971 births
2016 deaths
Members of the Chamber of Deputies (Mexico)
Women members of the Chamber of Deputies (Mexico)
Mexican people of Basque descent
New Alliance Party (Mexico) politicians
21st-century Mexican politicians
21st-century Mexican women politicians
Universidad Iberoamericana alumni
Politicians from Mexico City
Deaths from brain cancer in Mexico
Deputies of the LX Legislature of Mexico
Members of the Senate of the Republic (Mexico)
Women members of the Senate of the Republic (Mexico)